Georges Méliès (1861–1938) was a French pioneering filmmaker.

Melies may also refer to:

 Gaston Méliès (1852–1915), French film director, brother of Georges Méliès
 Méliès d'Or, an award for European horror movies

See also
 Milies (disambiguation)